The 2019–20 Scottish Cup was the 135th season of Scotland's most prestigious football knockout competition. The tournament was sponsored by bookmaker William Hill in what was the final season of a nine-year partnership, after contract negotiations saw the initial five-year contract extended for an additional four years in October 2015. This was the first season in which a match from every round of the tournament proper is broadcast live via TV partners Premier Sports and BBC Scotland, with one match per rounds 1–3 being shown live on the BBC Scotland channel for the first time.

On 13 March 2020, the competition was indefinitely suspended due to the COVID-19 pandemic.
The competition resumed with the semi-finals on the weekend of 31 October and was completed with the final on 20 December 2020. The three matches at Hampden Park were played behind closed doors due to Scottish Government restrictions.

The defending champions were Celtic who won the 2019 Scottish Cup Final on 25 May 2019.

Calendar
The calendar for the 2019–20 Scottish Cup, as announced by Scottish Football Association.

Preliminary rounds
The first preliminary round took place on 10 August 2019 and the second preliminary round took place on 31 August 2019. A total of 27 teams competed in the preliminary rounds with seven teams advancing to the first round.

Draw
The draw for the preliminary rounds took place on Thursday, 18 July 2019  at Hampden Park and was made by Scotland internationals Lee Alexander and Leanne Crichton.

27 clubs were involved in the draw, of which one received a bye to the second preliminary round, while the other 26 entered the first preliminary round. The teams competing in these rounds were made up of teams from the East of Scotland Football League (16), South of Scotland Football League (4), North Caledonian Football League (1), Scottish Junior Football Association (4) and the Scottish Amateur Football Association (2).

Blackburn United, Broxburn Athletic, Dundonald Bluebell, Easthouses Lily Miners Welfare, Hill of Beath Hawthorn, Jeanfield Swifts, and Penicuik Athletic took part in the Scottish Cup for the first time having each gained their Club Licence, along with Camelon Juniors who made their debut as 2018–19 South & East Cup-Winners Shield winners.

There were three parts to the draw. The first part determined which club, from the 23 eligible, received a bye to the second preliminary round. The clubs which did not receive a bye into the second preliminary round entered the first preliminary round. Thirteen ties were then drawn in the first preliminary round to be played on Saturday, 10 August 2019. The final part of the draw saw seven ties drawn in the second preliminary round to be played on Saturday, 31 August 2019.

Clubs with a valid Club Licence at the date of the draw were eligible for a bye to the second preliminary round. Teams in Bold advanced to the first round.

Preliminary round one
Golspie Sutherland received a bye to preliminary round two.

Matches

Replay

Preliminary round two

Matches

First round
The first round took place on the weekend of 21 September 2019. Along with the seven winners from the second preliminary round, there were 29 new entries at this stage - 16 from the Highland Football League and 13 from the Lowland Football League.

Draw
The draw for the first round took place on Sunday 1 September 2019 during Sportscene live on BBC Scotland and was made by Scotland squad members Stephen O'Donnell and Craig MacGillivray.

Teams in Italics were not known at the time of the draw. Teams in Bold advanced to the second round.

Matches

Replays

Second round
The second round took place on the weekend of 19 October 2019. Along with the 18 winners from the first round, there were 14 new entries at this stage - one from the Highland Football League (Brora Rangers), three from the Lowland Football League (Berwick Rangers, BSC Glasgow and East Kilbride) and all 10 teams from League Two.

Draw

The draw for the second round took place on Sunday 22 September 2019 during Sportscene live on BBC Scotland and was made by Kenny Miller and Kris Doolan.

Teams in italics were not known at the time of the draw. Teams in Bold advanced to the third round.

Matches

Replays

Third round
The third round took place on the weekend of 23 November 2019. Along with the 16 winners from the second round, there were 16 new entries at this stage - all 10 from League One, and six from the Championship.

Draw

The draw for the third round took place on Sunday 20 October 2019 during Sportscene live on BBC Scotland.

Teams in Italics were not known at the time of the draw. Teams in Bold advanced to the fourth round.

Matches

Replays

Fourth round
The fourth round took place on the weekend of 18 January 2020. Along with the 16 winners from the third round, there were 16 new entries at this stage - the remaining four clubs from the Championship, and all 12 from the Premiership.

Draw

The draw for the fourth round took place on Sunday 24 November 2019 during Sportscene live on BBC Scotland. Broxburn Athletic, the lowest ranked team left in the competition, were drawn against Premiership club St Mirren (54 places above them), which at the time represented the biggest league position gap between two teams in the competition's history since the pyramid system was introduced.

Teams in Italics were not known at the time of the draw. Teams in Bold advanced to the fifth round.

Matches

Replays

Fifth round

Draw
The draw for the fifth round took place on Sunday 19 January 2020 during Sportscene live on BBC Scotland.

Teams in italics were unknown at the time of the draw.

Teams in Bold advanced to the quarter-finals.

Following on from a campaign in England's FA Cup, all matches kicked-off one minute later than originally scheduled to raise awareness and encourage supporters to talk about their mental health.

Matches

Replays

Quarter-finals
The quarter-finals were scheduled to take place over the weekend of 29 February 2020.

Draw
The draw for the quarter-finals took place on Sunday 9 February 2020 following the Clyde-Celtic match live on Premier Sports 1. The draw was also live on the Premier Sports Facebook and Twitter pages and the Scottish Cup Facebook and Twitter pages and the BBC Sport website.

Teams in Italics were unknown at the time of the draw.

Teams in Bold advanced to the semi-finals.

Matches

Semi-finals
The semi-finals were originally scheduled to take place at Hampden Park over the weekend of 11 April 2020 but were postponed due to the COVID-19 pandemic.

Draw
The draw for the semi-finals took place on Sunday 1 March 2020 following the St Johnstone-Celtic match live on Premier Sports 1. The draw was also live on the Scottish Cup Twitter page.

Final

The final was originally scheduled to be played on 9 May 2020 at Hampden Park in Glasgow, but was postponed due to the coronavirus pandemic. On 21 July, it was rescheduled for 20 December.

Broadcasting
The Scottish Cup is broadcast by Premier Sports and BBC Scotland. Premier Sports has the first 2 picks of Round 4 and Round 5, the quarter-finals as well as first pick of one semi-final and will air the final non-exclusively. BBC Scotland will broadcast one match per round from the first to third rounds and two matches per round from the fourth round to the quarter-finals, as well as one semi-final and the final.

The following matches are to be broadcast live on UK television:

References

2019–20 in Scottish football cups
2019-20
2019–20 European domestic association football cups
Scottish Cup